Robert A. (Bob) Westbrooks is an American attorney and government executive, Certified Public Accountant, auditor, federal agent, government watchdog, speaker and author. Westbrooks is best known for the transparency he provides to the American public in his current role;  Executive Director of the Pandemic Response Accountability Committee (PRAC), an independent committee within the Council of the Inspectors General on Integrity and Efficiency (CIGIE).
PRAC was created by the Coronavirus Aid, Relief, and Economic Security (CARES) Act of 2020, and is charged with overseeing the now-$5 trillion in government spending relief efforts in response to the COVID-19 pandemic, specifically with respect to fraud, waste, abuse, and mismanagement. As of September 2021, PRAC reported an estimated $100 billion in financial benefits the government distributed were fraudulent, and over $10 billion of the $150 billion given directly to the states for local distribution has yet to be spent. The PRAC provides extensive information related to the government's financial COVID-19 relief efforts on its website, in both interactive and downloadable formats.

Education 
Westbrooks earned a Bachelor of Arts degree in justice from American University, and a Juris Doctor from the University of Maryland, Francis King Carey School of Law. After graduating from law school, he was admitted to the Maryland State Bar Association.

Career 
Westbrooks began his public career as a staffer in the United States Senate before serving as a Postal Inspector at the United States Postal Inspection Service. Westbrooks later worked as a Special Agent and agency leader at the United States Postal Service, Office of Inspector General, the Office of Inspector General for the Department of Transportation, and the National Archives and Records Administration, Office of Inspector General. He then served as Deputy Inspector General for the Small Business Administration, Office of Inspector General, until 2015.

In May 2015, Westbrooks was appointed Inspector General of the Pension Benefit Guaranty Corporation (PBGC), and worked in that capacity for approximately five years. During his time PBGC, Westbrooks also served on the CIGIE Executive Council, prior to his selection for Executive Director of the Pandemic Response Accountability Committee on April 27, 2020.

References 

Living people
United States Inspectors General by name
Maryland lawyers
American University alumni
University of Maryland Francis King Carey School of Law alumni
Trump administration personnel
Year of birth missing (living people)